"The Diary of Horace Wimp" is the fourth track on the Electric Light Orchestra album Discovery, written by Jeff Lynne.

Released in 1979 as a single, the song is Beatlesque in nature and became a Top Ten hit in the UK and Ireland. The lyrics describe a week in the life of a repressed man who wants to express his affection towards a woman he meets, and overcomes his shy nature with the help of "a voice from above." The day Saturday is omitted – this is because, as explained by Jeff Lynne: "The football match is played on a Saturday".

The music video references Citizen Kane in its ending, showing a closeup of Jeff Lynne saying "Horace Wimp," echoing Orson Welles' character in the film saying "Rosebud" as he dies.

B-side
"Down Home Town" first appeared on the band's fifth album Face the Music. It also featured as the flip side to the US single "Last Train to London".

"Down Home Town" contains an intro with a backmasked message, the backing chorus of the previous track, "Waterfall": "Face the mighty waterfall, face the mighty waterfall." This song includes an orchestral intro (after the "Waterfall" refrain) and a similar ending. These reverse recorded words were only used because of the sound effect.

Chart positions

References

1979 singles
1979 songs
Electric Light Orchestra songs
Jet Records singles
Song recordings produced by Jeff Lynne
Songs written by Jeff Lynne
Songs about fictional male characters